Mónica Javiera Blanco Suárez (born 1 August 1972) was a Chilean lawyer and politician. She was minister during the second government of Michelle Bachelet (2014−2018)

References

1972 births
Chilean people
Pontifical Catholic University of Chile alumni
21st-century Chilean politicians
Living people